Tanjong Batu may refer to:
 Tanjong Batu (Sabah state constituency), represented in the Sabah State Legislative Assembly
 Tanjong Batu (Sarawak state constituency), represented in the Sarawak State Legislative Assembly

See also
 Tanjong Datu